All Alone may refer to:

Film and television 
 All Alone (film), a 2013 Iranian film
 All Alone (film series), a 2006–2008 series of pornographic films
 "All Alone" (The Marvelous Mrs. Maisel), a television episode
 "All Alone" (Six Feet Under), a television episode

Albums
 All Alone (André Previn album), 1967
 All Alone (Dolo Coker album) or the title song, 1981
 All Alone (Frank Sinatra album), 1962
 All Alone (Jo Stafford album), 1963
 All Alone (Ron Carter album), 1988
 All Alone, an EP by the Sins of Thy Beloved, 1997

Songs
 "All Alone" (Irving Berlin song), a 1924 composition; recorded by many artists, including Frank Sinatra
 "All Alone", composed by Harry Von Tilzer
 "All Alone", by 1 Giant Leap from 1 Giant Leap, 2002
 "All Alone", by the Beach Boys from Endless Harmony Soundtrack, 1998
 "All Alone", by Blind Witness from Nightmare on Providence Street, 2010
 "All Alone", by Chris Richardson, 2008
 "All Alone", by the Clientele from Music for the Age of Miracles, 2017
 "All Alone", by Fun from Some Nights, 2012
 "All Alone", by Gorillaz from Demon Days, 2005
 "All Alone", by Grabbitz and Pegboard Nerds, 2016
 "All Alone", by Jackson Jackson, 2008
 "All Alone", by Kim Jae-joong from I, 2013
 "All Alone", by Kutless from Sea of Faces, 2004
 "All Alone", by Mad Season from Above, 1995
 "All Alone", by T. Rex from Futuristic Dragon, 1976
 All Alone (Jordin Tan), 2022

Other uses 
 All Alone (novel), a 1953 children's novel by Claire Huchet Bishop
 All Alone (pigeon), a war pigeon decorated for bravery in 1946